"My Homeland, Tennessee," the first of Tennessee's ten official state songs, was written by Roy Lamont Smith and Nell Grayson Taylor.  Taylor, a previously published poet and World War I nurse, was responsible for the text of the song.  Smith, an instructor at the Cadek Conservatory of Music in Chattanooga, Tennessee, supplied the music, and the combined effort was entered into a contest soliciting a patriotic state song for Tennessee.  The song won, and as a result, it was adopted by the Tennessee State Legislature in 1925.

The Nashville Children's Choir singing "My Homeland, Tennessee"

References

1925 songs